Liure is a municipality in the Honduran department of El Paraíso.

Name Origin 
It is said that the name means "Free", since it wanted to express that the residents of the new town were finally emancipated of Texiguat. However, it is speculated that the name really means "Water of Feathers".

Villages
It has around 14,000 inhabitants, spread over 5 villages:
 Bocuire
 Santa Cruz
 San Ramon
 Monte Grande
 Asuncion

References 

Municipalities of the El Paraíso Department